Cameron "Cammy" Mackay (born 9 December 1996) is a Scottish professional footballer who plays as a goalkeeper for Inverness Caledonian Thistle.

Career
He made his debut for Inverness Caledonian Thistle in May 2015, coming on as a late substitute for Ryan Esson, in a game against Celtic at Parkhead. The following week, he was an unused substitute for Inverness as they won the Scottish Cup Final at Hampden Park.

Mackay was loaned out to Scottish League Two side Elgin City at the start of the 2016–17 season, however, his move was cut short and he returned to Thistle temporarily in September 2016 to provide goalkeeping cover after second-choice keeper Ryan Esson suffered an elbow injury. On 29 October 2016, Mackay made his first league start for Inverness against Hearts after Owain Fôn Williams was injured in the pre-match warm-up. Mackay subsequently returned to Elgin City on loan in December 2016.

References

External links

1996 births
Living people
Scottish footballers
Inverness Caledonian Thistle F.C. players
Elgin City F.C. players
Association football goalkeepers
Scottish Professional Football League players
Clachnacuddin F.C. players

Brora Rangers F.C. players
Rothes F.C. players